Katarzyna Kawa (born 17 November 1992) is a Polish professional tennis player. Her career-high WTA rankings are 112 in singles, achieved November 2020, and world No. 70 in doubles, set on 26 September 2022. She has won two WTA Challenger doubles titles, and also seven singles and 19 doubles titles on tournaments of the ITF Women's Circuit.

Personal
Katarzyna Kawa was born in Krynica-Zdrój, but moved in 2013 to Poznań, Poland, where she currently resides. She started playing tennis at age seven and is coached by Grzegorz Garczyński. Parents are Anna and Jacek, two sisters are Monika and Weronika, and brother is Radomir. Hobbies include reading and traveling. Idolizes Justine Henin and Novak Djokovic. Favorite shot is her backhand and her favorite surfaces to compete on are both clay and grass.

Career

2019: First WTA final and breakthrough

In July, Kawa made it through the qualifying rounds at the Baltic Open to book her spot in the final with a straight-sets victory over Bernarda Pera. Kawa reached the semifinal after beating Anna Danilina, Naiktha Bains, Ysaline Bonaventure, Jana Fett, Chloe Paquet. In the final, she lost to the top seed Anastasija Sevastova, in three sets.

2020-21: Major debut & WTA Tour quarterfinal
In 2020, she made her major debut at the US Open as a direct entry.

At the 2021 National Tennis Championships in Bytom, Kawa ended runner-up in singles and won the title in doubles alongside Weronika Falkowska. She continued at the Poland Open in Gdynia where she upset third seed Irina-Camelia Begu in the second round, before she lost her quarterfinal match against Kateryna Kozlova.

2022: Wimbledon debut and first win
She qualified for the first time for the Wimbledon Championships, and recorded her first main-draw match win at this major over Rebecca Marino.
At the Poland Open held in Warsaw, Kawa reached her first WTA Tour doubles final, partnering with Alicja Rosolska, they finished runners-up.

Grand Slam performance timelines

Singles

Doubles

WTA career finals

Singles: 1 (1 runner-up)

Doubles: 1 (1 runner-up)

WTA Challenger finals

Doubles: 3 (2 titles, 1 runner-up)

ITF Circuit finals

Singles: 15 (7 titles, 8 runner-ups)

Doubles: 33 (19 titles, 14 runner-ups)

Notes

References

External links
 
 

1992 births
Living people
Polish female tennis players
People from Krynica-Zdrój
20th-century Polish women
21st-century Polish women